Michael West may refer to:

 Michael West (British Army officer) (1905–1978), British general
 Michael West (footballer) (born 1991), English footballer
 Michael West (playwright) (born 1967), Irish writer
 Michael Philip West (1888–1973), English teacher and researcher who served in India
 Michael D. West (born 1953), American gerontologist and CEO of BioTime
 Mike West (swimmer) (born 1964), Canadian Olympic backstroke medalist
 Corinne Michelle West, American painter who went by the name Michael West (and briefly Mikael West)
 Michael West (journalist), Australian investigative journalist, founder of MichaelWestMedia